Saint-Dizier-Masbaraud is a commune in the Creuse department in central France. It was established on 1 January 2019 by merger of the former communes of Saint-Dizier-Leyrenne (the seat) and Masbaraud-Mérignat.

See also
Communes of the Creuse department

References

Communes of Creuse